Flexiseps valhallae is a species of skink endemic to the Glorioso Islands.

References

Reptiles described in 1909
Flexiseps
Taxa named by George Albert Boulenger